The Bugatti Veyron EB 16.4 is a mid-engine sports car, designed and developed in Germany by the Volkswagen Group and Bugatti and manufactured in Molsheim, France, by French automobile manufacturer Bugatti. It was named after the racing driver Pierre Veyron.

It was named the 2000s Car of the Decade by the BBC television programme Top Gear. The standard Veyron also won Top Gears Best Car Driven All Year award in 2005.

The Veyron's chief designer was Hartmut Warkuß, with the exterior being designed by Jozef Kabaň of Volkswagen. Much of the engineering work was conducted under the guidance of chief technical officer Wolfgang Schreiber. The Veyron includes a sound system designed and built by Burmester Audiosysteme.

Several special variants have been produced. In December 2010, Bugatti began offering prospective buyers the ability to customise exterior and interior colours by using the Veyron 16.4 Configurator application on the marque's official website. The Bugatti Veyron was discontinued in late 2014, but special edition models continued to be produced until 2015.

Origins 

In May 1998, Volkswagen AG acquired the rights to use the Bugatti logo and the trade name Bugatti Automobiles S.A.S. To succeed the EB 110 model produced under the previous ownership, the automaker quickly released a series of concept cars whose technological advancements would culminate in the form of the Veyron 16.4.

Between October 1998 and September 1999, Bugatti introduced a series of Giugiaro-designed concept vehicles, each with permanent four-wheel drive and powered by the Volkswagen-designed W18 engine. The first car, the EB 118, was a 2-door luxury coupé presented at the 1998 Paris Motor Show. The next car, the EB218, was a 4-door saloon presented at the 1999 Geneva Motor Show. The third and final car, the 18/3 Chiron, was a mid-engine sports car presented at the 1999 International Motor Show in Frankfurt.

In October 1999, Bugatti unveiled a fourth concept car at the Tokyo Motor Show. The EB 18/4 Veyron was a mid-engine sports car styled in-house under the direction of Hartmut Warkuß. In 2000, a modified version, the EB 16/4 Veyron, was displayed at motor shows in Detroit, Geneva, and Paris. Rather than the three-bank W18 engine of the four previous concept cars, the EB 16/4 featured the four-bank W16 engine architecture installed in every production example of the Veyron.

The decision to start production of the car was made by the Volkswagen Group in 2001. The first roadworthy prototype was completed in August 2003. It is identical to the later series variant, except for a few details. In the transition from development to series production, considerable technical problems had to be addressed, repeatedly delaying production until September 2005.
 
The Veyron EB 16.4 is named in honor of Pierre Veyron, a Bugatti development engineer, test driver and company race driver who, with co-driver Jean-Pierre Wimille, won the 1939 24 Hours of Le Mans while driving a Bugatti. The "EB" refers to Bugatti founder Ettore Bugatti and the "16.4" refers to the engine's 16 cylinders and quad-turbochargers.

Bugatti Veyron (2005–2011)

Specifications and performance 

The Veyron features an 8.0-litre, quad-turbocharged, W16 cylinder engine, equivalent to two narrow-angle V8 engines bolted together. Each cylinder has four valves for a total of 64, but the configuration of each bank allows two overhead camshafts to drive two banks of cylinders so only four camshafts are needed. The engine is fed by four turbochargers and displaces , with a square  bore and stroke.

The transmission is a dual-clutch direct-shift computer-controlled automatic transmission having seven gear ratios, with magnesium paddles behind the steering wheel and a shift time of less than 150 milliseconds, built by Ricardo of England rather than Borg-Warner, who designed the six speed DSG used in the mainstream Volkswagen Group marques. The Veyron can be driven in either semi-automatic or fully-automatic mode. It also has permanent all-wheel drive using the Haldex Traction system. The tyres  can be mounted on the wheels only in France, a service which costs .
The Bugatti Veyron has a total of ten radiators:
3 heat exchangers for the air-to-liquid intercoolers.
3 engine radiators.
1 for the air conditioning system.
1 transmission oil radiator.
1 differential oil radiator.
1 engine oil radiator

Engine power output 

Top speed 
German inspection officials recorded an average top speed of the original version at  during test sessions on Volkswagen Group's private Ehra-Lessien test track on 19 April 2005.

May noted that at top speed the engine consumes  of air per minute (as much as a human breathes in four days). May responded that the Veyron was very controlled, and only wobbled slightly when the air brake deployed.

At the same time, the wing and spoiler deploy. In this handling mode, the wing provides  of downforce, holding the car to the road.

Top speed mode must be entered while the vehicle is at rest. Its driver must toggle a special top speed key to the left of their seat, which triggers a checklist to establish whether the car and its driver are ready to attempt to reach .

Braking 
The Veyron's brakes use cross drilled, radially vented carbon fibre reinforced silicon carbide (C/SiC) composite discs, manufactured by SGL Carbon, which have less brake fade and weigh less than standard cast iron discs. The lightweight aluminium alloy monobloc brake calipers are made by AP Racing; the front have eight titanium pistons and the rear calipers have six pistons. Bugatti claims maximum deceleration of 1.3 g on road tyres. As an added safety feature, in the event of brake failure, an anti-lock braking system (ABS) has also been installed on the handbrake.

At speeds above , the rear wing also acts as an airbrake, snapping to a 55° angle in 0.4 seconds once brakes are applied, providing an additional 0.68 g (6.66 m/s2) of deceleration (equivalent to the stopping power of an ordinary hatchback).

Special editions

Bugatti Veyron 16.4 Grand Sport (2009–2015) 

The targa top version of the Bugatti Veyron EB 16.4, dubbed the Bugatti Veyron 16.4 Grand Sport, was unveiled at the 2008 Pebble Beach Concours d'Elegance. It has extensive reinforcements to compensate for the lack of a standard roof and small changes to the windshield and running lights. Two removable tops are included, the second a temporary arrangement fashioned after an umbrella. The Grand Sport edition was limited to 150 units, with the first 50 going exclusively to registered Bugatti customers. Production began in the second quarter of 2009.

Special editions

Bugatti Veyron 16.4 Super Sport, World Record Edition (2010–2011) 

The Bugatti Veyron 16.4 Super Sport is a faster, more powerful version of the Bugatti Veyron 16.4. Production was limited to 30 units.

The Bugatti Veyron 16.4 Super Sport World Record Edition is a version of the Bugatti Veyron 16.4 SuperSport. It is limited to five units. It has an orange body detailing, orange wheels, and a special black exposed carbon body. The electronic limiter is also removed with this version.

The model was unveiled in 2010 at The Quail, followed by the 2010 Monterey Historic Races at Laguna Seca, and the 2010 Pebble Beach Concours d'Elegance.

Top Speed World Record 
Later that day, Bugatti's official test driver Pierre Henri Raphanel drove the Super Sport version of the Veyron at the same track to establish the car's top speed. The  mark was reached by averaging the Super Sport's two test runs, the first reaching  and the second .

Yet, after a query by the Sunday Times Guinness' PR director Jaime Strang was quoted on 5 April 2013: "As the car's speed limiter was deactivated, this modification was against the official guidelines. Consequently, the vehicle's record set at 431.072 km/h is no longer valid." On 10 April 2013, it was written on its website: "Guinness World Records would like to confirm that Bugatti's record has not been disqualified; the record category is currently under review."

On 15 April 2013, Bugatti's speed record was confirmed: "Following a thorough review conducted with a number of external experts, Guinness World Records is pleased to announce the confirmation of Bugatti's record of Fastest production car achieved by the Veyron 16.4 SuperSport. The focus of the review was with respect to what may constitute a modification to a car's standard specification. Having evaluated all the necessary information, Guinness World Records is now satisfied that a change to the speed limiter does not alter the fundamental design of the car or its engine."

Bugatti Veyron 16.4 Grand Sport Vitesse (2012–2015) 

The Bugatti Veyron 16.4 Grand Sport Vitesse is a targa top version of the Veyron Super Sport.

The Vitesse was first unveiled at the 2012 Geneva Motor Show and later at the 2012 Beijing Auto Show and the 2012 São Paulo Motor Show.

Special editions 
A number of special editions of the Vitesse were made:

In 2013, Bugatti produced a series of Vitesse dedicated to racing legends, including Jean-Pierre Wimille, Jean Bugatti, Meo Costantini, and Ettore Bugatti.

All six models in the Legend series are limited to three vehicles:

Records 

After the world record attempt, Dr. Wolfgang Schreiber, President of Bugatti Automobiles S.A.S, said "When we introduced the Vitesse, we established the top speed for open-top driving to be 375 km/h. Still, we could not let go of the idea of reaching the 400 km/h mark with this car as well. The fact that we have succeeded in reaching 408.84 km/h is a thrill for me, and it reaffirms once again that Bugatti is the leader when it comes to technology in the international automotive industry." The driver, Anthony Liu, claimed "Even at such high speeds it remained incredibly comfortable and stable. With an open-top, you can really experience the sound of the engine and yet even at higher speeds I did not get compromised by the wind at all."

Specifications (all variants)

Special editions by car tuners

Bugatti Veyron Linea Vincero 
The Bugatti Veyron Linea Vincero is a Veyron 16.4 modified by the German car modification firm Mansory.

The Linea Vincero has new wheel rims and new exterior lower bodywork. It extensively uses carbon fibre in the interior and exterior as well.

This car, with its interior and exterior customisations, is worth US$1 million more than a standard Veyron 16.4.

Bugatti Veyron Linea D'oro 
The Bugatti Veyron Linea D'oro is a car made on the basis of the Veyron Grand Sport and the 16.4 by the German car modification firm Mansory.

The D'oro's exterior design is identical to its predecessor's but it has a few differences such as the gold paint on the badge, rims and other features. The iconic "V" shaped badge is also present on this car's front grille.

Bugatti Veyron Linea Viviere 

The Bugatti Veyron Linea Viviere (commonly known as the Mansory Viviere) is a car made on the basis of the Bugatti Veyron Super Sport by the German car modification firm Mansory.

This car's exterior design features the iconic "V" shaped front grille and an additional exhaust system below its rear lights. The interior has been handcrafted and carbon fibre has been extensively used.

This car has a second generation known as the Viviere Diamond Edition which has been made on the same basis. This car is the final Veyron Edition tuned by Mansory and has a marble coloured exterior paintwork.

The Bugatti Veyron Linea Viviere costs US$2.3 million, making it one of the most expensive Veyrons ever produced.

Production 
, 405 cars had been produced and delivered to customers worldwide, with orders that have already been placed for another 30. Bugatti was reported to produce 300 coupés and 150 roadsters up to the end of 2015. Production amounted to 450 units in a span of over 10 years. The final production vehicle, a Grand Sport Vitesse titled "La Finale" (The Last One), was displayed at the Geneva Motor Show from 5–15 March 2015.

Future development 
In 2008, Bugatti then-CEO Dr Franz-Josef Paefgen confirmed that the Veyron would be replaced by another high-end model by 2012. In 2011, the new CEO Wolfgang Dürheimer revealed that the company was planning to produce two models in the future — one a sports car-successor to the Veyron, the other a limousine known as the Bugatti 16C Galibier, which was later cancelled since Bugatti was later then working on a successor to the Veyron, which became the Bugatti Chiron.

The successor to the Veyron was unveiled in concept form as the Bugatti Vision Gran Turismo at the September 2015 Frankfurt Motor Show.

A toned-down version of the radically styled Vision Gran Turismo concept car, now called the Chiron, debuted at the March 2016 Geneva Motor Show. Production started in 2017 and will be limited to 500 units.

Sales 

 The last Veyron, No. 450 was sold in May 2014.

Reception

Top Gear 
All three former presenters of the popular BBC motoring show Top Gear have given the Veyron considerable praise. While initially skeptical that the Veyron would ever be produced, Jeremy Clarkson later declared the Veyron "the greatest car ever made and the greatest car we will ever see in our lifetime", comparing it to Concorde and S.S. Great Britain. Volkswagen designed the car merely as a technical exercise. James May described the Veyron as "our Concorde moment". Clarkson test drove the Veyron from Alba in northern Italy to London in a race against May and Richard Hammond who made the journey in a Cessna 182 aeroplane.

In series 10, Hammond raced the Veyron against the Eurofighter Typhoon and lost. He also raced the car in Series 13 against a McLaren F1 driven by The Stig in a one-mile (1.6 km) drag race in Abu Dhabi. The commentary focused on Bugatti's "amazing technical achievement" versus the "non-gizmo" racing purity of the F1. Hammond has stated that he did not use the Veyron's launch control in order to make the race more interesting.

The Veyron also won the award for "Car of the Decade" in Top Gear end of 2010 award show. Clarkson commented, "It was a car that just rewrote the rule book really, an amazing piece of engineering, a genuine Concorde moment". When the standard version was tested in 2008, it did not reach the top of the lap time leader board, with a time of 1:18.3, which was speculated as being due to the car's considerable weight disadvantage against the other cars towards the top.

Martin Roach 
In 2011, Martin Roach's book Bugatti Veyron: A Quest for Perfection – The Story of the Greatest Car in the World took the stance that the car had now become so famous that it is effectively a bona fide celebrity. The book follows its author as he attempts to track down and drive the car, along the way interviewing chief designers, test drivers, and the president of Bugatti.

Gordon Murray 
During its development period McLaren F1 designer Gordon Murray said in UK auto magazine Evo: "The most pointless exercise on the planet has got to be this four-wheel-drive, thousand-horsepower Bugatti." But after driving it he called it "a huge achievement".

Murray was impressed with the Veyron's engine and transmission after he test drove one for Road & Track magazine. He also praised its styling: "The styling is a wonderful mélange of classic curves and mechanical edges and elements — this should ensure that the car will still look good years from now, and therefore have a chance of becoming a future classic."

See also 
List of fastest production cars
List of production cars by power output

References

External links 

Veyron
Rear mid-engine, all-wheel-drive vehicles
Grand tourers
Roadsters
2010s cars
Cars introduced in 2005
Flagship vehicles